Annette K. Olesen is a Danish screenwriter and director. Her films Minor Mishaps (2002), In Your Hands (2004), and Little Soldier (2008) premiered at the Berlin International Film Festival and were nominated for the Golden Bear.

Career
Olesen made her feature film debut at the 52nd Berlin International Film Festival with Minor Mishaps, where it won the Blue Angel Award.

References

External links
 

1965 births
Living people
Danish women film directors
Danish women screenwriters
Danish women writers
Film directors from Copenhagen